Kanal III C is a drainage canal of North Rhine-Westphalia, Germany. It discharges into the Niers via the Kanal III3b near Grefrath.

References

CKanalIIIc
Geography of North Rhine-Westphalia
Canals in Germany